Boyd Strait is the  wide strait lying between Snow Island and Smith Island in the South Shetland Islands, Antarctica, and linking Drake Passage and the Bransfield Strait.

The strait was named in 1823 by a British expedition under James Weddell for Captain David Boyd, Royal Navy.

Location

British mapping in 1823 and 1930-1931.

Maps
 Chart of South Shetland including Coronation Island, &c. from the exploration of the sloop Dove in the years 1821 and 1822 by George Powell Commander of the same. Scale ca. 1:200000. London: Laurie, 1822.
 South Shetland Islands : Map 3.  Scale 1:200000. Cambridge: British Antarctic Survey, 2008.

References
 Boyd Strait. SCAR Composite Antarctic Gazetteer
 

Bodies of water of Smith Island (South Shetland Islands)
Straits of the South Shetland Islands